St. Joseph Academy is a traditional Roman Catholic K-12 school located in San Marcos, CA.  Its stated mission is "to transform human society through the most effective means possible, namely through training the youth in faith, reason, and virtue". The school is operated independent of the Roman Catholic Diocese of San Diego and is the only school located within the Diocese that offers a complete K-12 education. St. Joseph Academy has been named by the Catholic High School Honor Roll as one of the top 50 Catholic High Schools in the United States for three consecutive years and carries a 99% college matriculation rate . The school is accredited by the Western Association of Schools and Colleges accredited school and formally approved by the Diocese of San Diego.

Overview
St. Joseph Academy's curriculum is taught using the Classical Christian education model, which emphasizes biblical teachings and incorporates the Trivium teaching method. Students typically score between the 85th and 99th percentile on national standardized achievement testing, and grade equivalent scores for K-12 average nearly three grade levels above the national average. The K-5 primary grades are taught using the Spalding Method. Primary grade teachers receive formal training in this method, which is child-centered and focuses on the physical and mental well-being of students.

Grades 6-8 emphasizes fundamental skill acquisition; accordingly, teachers employ a direct approach to instruction so that the student clearly understands the goal of each lesson at its beginning. Moreover, a special emphasis is placed on the Socratic Method of learning where teachers skillfully question students to educe or draw forth student insight, analysis and expression. In addition, a unique feature of its middle school curriculum is the teaching of Latin, a practice which has largely been abandoned by most Catholic primary schools.

St. Joseph Academy's High School's college preparatory curriculum is approved by the University of California and meets its entrance requirements. In addition, the high school offers an in-house SAT training course.
 
In addition to a wide offering of extracurricular clubs, its recognized athletic program includes membership in the North County Parochial League for middle school and the California Interscholastic Federation (C.I.F.). for high school. Athletic activities include tackle football, flag football, volleyball, basketball, soccer, golf, and track.

St. Joseph Academy is centered around its stated fidelity to the Magisterium of the Catholic Church. Aside from Religion being taught at every grade level, the entire school attends weekly Mass, which includes a monthly Tridentine Mass (traditional Latin Mass) offered by priests from St. Anne's Catholic Church. Priests from the Miles Christi religious order hear weekly confessions and offer students spiritual direction.

History
In 1995, two Catholic mothers desired a school in North County (San Diego area) that would provide their children with both solid academics and faith formation within an integrated K-12 curriculum. With the blessing of then San Diego Bishop Robert Brom, they founded Sierra Madre Academy in a small commercial building in San Marcos. Founded as Sierra Madre Academy, the school was renamed St. Joseph Academy in September 2008, when it moved to its new, full-sized campus.

During its first year, 25 students attended in grades one through nine. There were four full-time paid teachers, two volunteers teachers, a volunteer secretary, and a principal who also served as teacher.  In the second year, with word of mouth as its only marketing tool, the school tripled its enrollment to 77 students.  In 1997, to accommodate more students, the school leased additional space at another commercial building across a vacant field from the original school building to create at an "upper campus". The school housed grades K-3 in its original space, the "lower campus," while the upper campus was home to grades 4-12. Each year, more space was leased at the upper campus until there was a classroom for each grade and one computer classroom. In 2000, to expand its athletic and recreational opportunities, the school negotiated a lease for a vacant  lot between the two campuses.  With all-volunteer labor and mostly donated materials, parents and other supporters cleared the lot, fenced in the area, installed irrigation, and planted grass. At the same time, portions of the upper campus parking lot were fenced off for a basketball court.

In the 2004-05 school year, enrollment reached 189 students. Shortly thereafter, enrollment reached maximum capacity of 200 students, which prompted the need for an expanded campus.

New campus
On September 10, 2008, St. Joseph Academy opened a new campus located on Las Flores Drive in San Marcos, California. The new, 13-classroom campus allowed the school to increase enrollment to 350 students. In 2015, after receiving approval from city officials, the school embarked on a capital campaign to raise funds for Phase II of its campus, which will include science labs, additional classrooms, and a full-size gymnasium.

Teachers
St. Joseph Academy's teachers come from a wide variety of professional backgrounds, including pontifical academia, law, the armed forces, government, and science. This diversity of backgrounds and experience provides the students with varied styles of learning as well as an exposure to real-world skills and applications. Teachers have received degrees from many prestigious universities and colleges, including Michigan State University, University of Notre Dame, University of California, San Diego, Indiana University, Purdue University, Loyola Marymount, University of Dallas, Franciscan University of Steubenville, Thomas Aquinas College, Jamestown College, University of San Diego, and the Pontifical University of St. Thomas Aquinas (Angelicum) in Italy.

Advisory board
St. Joseph Academy's Advisory Board includes many prominent Catholic leaders, including Fr. Joseph Fessio, S.J., Fr. David Morrier, Dr. Scott Hahn, Fr. C. John McCloskey III, STD, Tim Staples, Barbara McGuiggen, Karl Keating, Dr. John W. Galten, Terri Barber, the Rev. Charles Wright, OSB, and Rev. T. Henry, TOR.

Graduates
Graduates have been accepted at universities including University of St. Andrews,  UCLA, UC Berkeley, University of Glasgow, Purdue University, University of Edinburgh, Catholic University of America, Rochester Institute of Technology, Franciscan University of Steubenville, Virginia Tech, George Mason University, University of Dallas, Thomas Aquinas College, Christendom College, Merrimack College, and Cebu Doctors' University in the Philippines. Other graduates have entered religious institutes and the priesthood.

Notes and references

External links
 School Website

High schools in San Diego County, California
Catholic secondary schools in California
Educational institutions established in 1994
Education in San Marcos, California
1994 establishments in California